The William Miller House is a historic home in Richmond, Virginia that was most recently a two-room bed and breakfast before again becoming a private residence.

History
The historic William Miller House Bed and Breakfast is located in Virginia’s Historic Fan District.  The home was built by William Miller in 1869 after the American Civil War.  William Miller worked as a proprietor for Rogers & Miller Marbleworks and the inn includes three marble mantels that were originally constructed in 1869.

The Locale
The William Miller house is located in the center of the Fan District was named after the configuration of streets that fan out from Belvidere Street.  The Historic Fan District was added to the National Register of Historic Places in 1985 and the boundary was extended in 1986.  Located nearby is Virginia Commonwealth University and a number of local restaurants, cafes, and museums.

See also
Historic
Richmond, Virginia
Bed and breakfast
National Register of Historic Places

References

External links
The William Miller House
Destination Nexus
National Register of Historic Places
Historic Fan District

Historic buildings and structures in the United States
Houses completed in 1869
Bed and breakfasts in Virginia
1869 establishments in Virginia